Let's Get Skase is a 2001 Australian comedy starring Lachy Hulme, Alex Dimitriades, Craig McLachlan, Alex Menglet, and Bill Kerr. It is based on the life of failed Australian businessman Christopher Skase, who after the collapse of his Qintex business fled to Majorca, Spain. Skase died at around the time of the film's release. It was filmed in Melbourne and Perth.

Plot
After the collapse of his massive Qintex business empire, Christopher Skase flees to the Spanish Island of Majorca, leaving angry creditors high and dry. Enter Peter Dellasandro, a fast-talking con man and failed entrepreneur who sees the "Chase For Skase" as a potential gold mine.
Dellasandro convinces the Creditors Board that he's the only man with the ability and recklessness to undertake the task demanded by his country: the kidnapping of Christopher Skase.
But not everyone is convinced, especially Danny D'Amato, the fiery son of the Creditors Chairman. Suspicious of Dellasandro, the two form an uneasy alliance as Dellasandro sets out to recruit the ego-centric TV host Eric Carney into his scheme, until seasoned mercenary Mitch Vendieks warns Dellasandro that Carney is planning a kidnap plot of his own.
Determined to beat Carney to the punch, Dellasandro and Danny join forces with Mitch to form their own team, recruiting the inept Sean Knight, mendacious getaway driver Dave Phibbs and cynical intelligence ace Rupert Wingate, who soon discovers that Skase is devising a deadly scheme to resurrect his business empire across Europe.
With time running out, Dellasandro and the boys head for Majorca and track Skase to his sprawling mansion, confronting the devious businessman.
The team is outnumbered by Skase's Security Guards and thus cannot manage to kidnap him. However, they make out with several computer discs which contain sensitive documents revealing Skase's plan to "bust out" Qintex. The information at hand is enough evidence for the Australian Government to make compensation payments to the Qintex Creditors Boardmembers.

Cast
 Lachy Hulme as Peter Dellasandro
 Alex Dimitriades as Daniel "Danny" D'Amato Jr
 Craig McLachlan as Eric Carney
 Bill Kerr as Mitchell Vendieks
 Torquil Neilson as Sean Knight
 Nick Sheppard as Dave Phibbs
 Adam Haddrick as Rupert Wingate
 William Ten Eyck as Dick Rydell
 Vince D'Amico as Daniel D'Amato Sr.
 Vivienne Garrett as Ruth D'Amato
 Nick Atkinson as Anthony D'Amato
 Sarah Borg as Maris D'Amato
 George Shevtsov as Beneheim Bencini
 Gordon Honeycombe as Murray Bishop
 Helen Buday as Judith Turner
 Wayne Hassell as Christopher Skase
 Diane West as Pixie Skase
 Andrew Denton as himself (archive footage)

Production
The film was based on a real-life proposal to abduct Christopher Skase but is mostly fictional. Skase died during post-production.

See also
 Cinema of Australia

References

External links

Let's Get Skase at Oz Movies
Let's Get Skase at the National Film and Sound Archive

2001 films
2001 comedy films
Australian comedy films
Films shot in Melbourne
Films produced by Colin South
Films produced by John Tatoulis
2000s English-language films